Jaime José Rotman  was an Argentine  football goalkeeper. He began his career in 1932 with Argentinos Juniors, where he played until 1935. He then joined Vélez Sársfield.

In 1942 he joined Club Atlético Atlanta, but he returned to Vélez after only one season with Atlanta. He retired from football in 1944 to take up the position of manager at Gimnasia y Esgrima de La Plata.

References

External links
 Jaime José Rotman at BDFA.com.ar 

Year of birth missing
Possibly living people
Argentine footballers
Association football goalkeepers
Argentinos Juniors footballers
Club Atlético Vélez Sarsfield footballers
Club Atlético Atlanta footballers
Argentine football managers
Club de Gimnasia y Esgrima La Plata managers
Place of birth missing (living people)